The 2022 Women's under-19 World Floorball Championships will be the 10th world championship in women's under-19 floorball. The tournament will be played in Katowice, Poland, and will take place from 31 August to 4 September, 2022. The event was originally scheduled to be played in New Zealand on 4–8 May 2022 but due to COVID-19 pandemic in New Zealand, it was rescheduled to August and September 2022.

Qualification 
A total of 18 teams registered for the event.  14 automatically qualified for the final round, and the final two spots were decided in a four team qualifier.

1.Russia was suspended, hence their withdrawal from the competition.
2.the IFF Central Board confirmed the inclusion of Italy to replace of Russia
3.Singapore withdrawal Under 19 replace of Austria

Venues

Groups

Preliminary round

Group A

Group B

Group C

Group D

Placement round

Quarterfinal 1

Germany vs Latvia

Quarterfinal 2

Norway vs Hungary

5th place game

Poland vs Slovakia

7th place game

Latvia vs Norway

9th place game

Germany vs Hungary

11th place game

New Zealand vs Denmark

13th place game

Austria vs Italy

15th place game

Canada vs Australia

Knock-out stage

Bracket

Semifinals

Switzerland vs Czech Republic

Sweden vs Finland

Bronze medal game

Gold medal game

Final standings

References

External links 

 Official site

Floorball World Championships
2022 in floorball
2022 in Polish women's sport
World Floorball Championships
World Floorball Championships